March Mammal Madness is an alternate March Madness tournament focusing on simulated combat between mammals. Katie Hinde created March Mammal Madness, using a 64 animal bracket, with the goal of using biological research to create (simulated) battles.

Katie Hinde, originally an assistant professor in the Department of Human Evolutionary Biology at Harvard University and currently an associate professor in the School of Human Evolution and Social Change at Arizona State University, later brought in three other educators to help her organize the event. This includes assistant professor at Boston University School of Medicine Kristi Lewton, a lecturer at State University of New York Joshua Drew, and assistant professor at Dominican University Christopher Anderson. Along with these educators, a team of artists lead by Charon Henning provides artwork of the various mammal competitors throughout the whole tournament. Together, they heavily research all of the combatants, using what they learn to provide an entertaining and informative experience.

In 2017, more educators were added on to the March Mammal Madness team to help with the competition. This includes Ph.D. student at the University of Notre Dame Mauna Dasari, postdoctoral fellow at the University of Notre Dame Marc Kissel, post-doctoral researcher and instructor at the University of Utah Patrice Kur genetics, genomics, and the phylogeny of the various mammals participating. This includes Anne Stone of the School of Human Evolution and Social Change, and Melissa Wilson Sayres from the School of Life Sciences at Arizona State University.

Bracket
The bracket itself is modeled after the NCAA championship, including an Elite Eight and a Final Four. The bracket is divided into four divisions, which change yearly. The 64 animals are chosen and put into the various divisions based on their characteristics. In the 2015 bracket, the chosen divisions were Mighty Mini Mammals, Mythical Mammals, Critically Endangered Mammals, and Sexy Beasts. Mammals such as the dwarf mongoose and the Java mouse-deer were chosen for the Mighty Mini Mammals, while legendary beasts such as Ratatoskr and the Yeti battled it out in the Mythical Mammals. The mammals compete against others in their division, eventually working their way down to the Final Four (one from each division), and finally the championship.

Battles
The battles are decided by a mix of scientific research, and an element of chance. Katie Hinde and the March Mammal Madness organizing team do in-depth research on the mammal contestants. Temperament, diet, social behavior, environment, size, and fight style are just a few of the factors that are taken into consideration. After these factors are weighed against each other, Hinde and the rest determine probability of one animal defeating another. This is how they develop the seed, or rank, of each mammal. Then a 100 sided die is rolled with a determined percentage numbers attributed to each animal. This adds an element of chance, since out in nature nothing is 100% guaranteed. Additionally, the environment in which the encounter takes place can be a major factor in the outcome. For the first few rounds, each fight takes place in the environment of the higher seeded animal. After the Sweet Sixteen, it is chosen at random and announced immediately prior to the encounter.

Combining research with an element of chance has led to some major upsets, just like with any sports bracket. In round one of the 2015 Mighty Mini Mammal division, the 14th-seeded numbat defeated the 3rd-seed quokka. The research is then used to create a narrative to explain the loss.  The narratives can range from a serious battle, to humorous happenstance. In 2014, research showed the pangolin to be the most trafficked animal on the planet. Before the match even began, the pangolin was captured by poachers and shipped away, forfeiting the fight.  Each round has a scheduled day and time, found on Katie Hinde's blog, Mammals Suck... Milk!.

Instead of just announcing the winners, the written narratives are live-tweeted like the match was happening that very moment. Fans can follow along and tweet back using the designated March Mammal Madness hashtag, creating a fun and exciting atmosphere where people can learn about the animals they support.  The creators use a combination of gamification, social media, and narrative in an attempt to make scientific research more accessible. As of 2019, approximately 1100 scholarly works have been represented by March Mammal Madness, which reached about 1% of all high school students in the United States.

In 2017, the wildcard match was performed as a live-action movie to celebrate the 5th anniversary of the tournament. The wildcard match was also done with four mammal competitors instead of the usual two. Members of the March Mammal Madness team dressed up as the competing mammals and acted out the battle in front of a green screen. The battle was then edited together and the final video was tweeted out during the first day of the 2017 March Mammal Madness season.

In 2018, brief summaries of the battles in the style of sports reporting were added, providing for a short recap of each encounter.

Past battle outcomes
All past battle outcomes and play by plays of the battles can be found on the March Mammal Madness Archives.

All tables begin with round two, after the first elimination. The animals' seed number is in parentheses (after round 2 only). If no animals advanced the cell is grey, if the animal was the champion the cell is gold.

2013
Divisions: Carnivores, Primates, Grazers and Browsers, and Hodge Podge

Animals who did not advance to round two: ferret, wolverine, leopard, meerkat, coyote, fennec fox, Tasmanian devil, island fox, dik-dik, camel, wildebeest, gerenuk, reindeer, gazelle, giraffe, duiker, shrew, anteater, wombat, ground squirrel, capybara, sugar glider, red panda, tenrec, naked mole rat, dusky titi monkey, rhesus macaque, lemur catta, bush baby, capuchin, tamarin, red colobus, marmoset.

2014
Divisions: Social Mammals, Marine Mammals, Who In The What Now, and Fossil Mammals

Animals who did not advance to round two: titi monkey, dingo, meerkat, beaver, marmot, bush dog, hyrax, bandicoot, fisher, saki monkey, Sunda colugo, pangolin, echidna, olinguito, mara, A. afarensis, A. sediba, dire wolf, aurochs, giant giraffid, megalania, rhino wombat, giant baboon, Godzilla platypus, sea otter, beluga whale, harbor seal, river dolphin, hooded seal, ringed seal, narwhal, manatee.

2015
Divisions: Mighty Minis, Critically Endangered, Mythical Mammals, and Sexy Beasts

Animals who did not advance to round two: jerboa, bumblebee bat, tent-making bat, pygmy mouse lemur, least weasel, pygmy possum, quokka, social tuco-tuco, dormouse, Kanko, Pegasus, Pooka, Ichneumon, Water Horse, Greek Sphinx, Kishi, Colo Colo, yellow-bellied marmot, bighorn sheep, olive baboon, vervet monkey, bongo, koala, Irish elk, European hare, silver pika, black dorcopsis, cloud rat, Siau Island tarsier, Javan slow loris, riverine rabbit, saola, Sibree's dwarf lemur.

2016
Divisions: Cold-Adapted Mammals, Mighty Giants, Mammal Mascots, and Mammals of the Nouns. For the mascot mammal bracket, the university and the mammal the mascot represents are linked separately.

Mammals who did not advance to round two: lemming, snow monkey, caribou, snowshoe hare, Antarctic fur seal, stoat, vicuña, Siberian chipmunk, Haverford black squirrel, Schoolcraft College Ocelots, Santa Clara bronco, Penn State mountain lions, Lethbridge pronghorn, Naval Academy goat, Texas A&M javelina, Yale bulldog, Thor hero shrew, giant cloud rat, giant elephant shrew, giant otter shrew, greater dwarf lemur, giant armadillo, giant flying squirrel, giant mole rat, shrew of the water, viscacha of the mountain, rabbit of the volcano, pocket gopher of the mountain, dog of the prairie, baby of the bush, cat of the sand, vole of the bank

2017
Divisions: Adjective Mammals, Coulda Shoulda, Desert Adapted, and Two Animals One Mammal

Animals who did not advance to round two: snow leopard, fisher, rhesus macaque, sac-winged bat, long-tailed pangolin, burrowing bettong, hairy-nosed wombat, bat-eared fox, red squirrel, brown-throated sloth, silky anteater, southern marsupial mole, meerkat, patas monkey, marbled polecat, bilby, long-eared hedgehog, sand cat, jerboa, giant red flying squirrel, lion, leopard, fossil baboon, dire wolf, giant armadillo, Irish elk, quokka, shrew mole, raccoon dog, otter civet, kangaroo rat, mouse opossum, deer mouse, squirrel monkey, grasshopper mouse

2018
Divisions: Antecessors, Great Adaptations, When the Kat's Away, and Urban Jungle

Animals who did not advance to round two: Jugulator, Thalassocnus, Procoptodon, Nuralagus rex, Archaeoindris, Aegyptopithecus, Palaeoloxodon, Deinogalerix, star-nosed mole, platypus, solenodon, ghost bat, desman, edible dormouse, coatimundi, fat-tailed dunnart, goldcrest, praying mantis, Bothrops asper, horseshoe crab, alligator snapping turtle, beaded lizard, giant salamander, cookiecutter shark, tardigrade, Belo Horizonte marmoset, raccoon, Moscow dog, opossum, striped skunk, eastern gray squirrel, Delhi rhesus, hedgehog.

Alt Advance
In 2018, the tardigrade advanced several rounds without winning. In the When the Kat's Away division, the anaconda didn't see it, but was the official winner. The tardigrade continued to ride each winning animal, thus becoming an "alt-champion."

2019 
Divisions: Jump Jump, Waterfalls, Tag Team, and CAT-e-Gory

Animals who did not advance to round two: Tiger beetle, Ringtail cat, Jackrabbit, Serval, Stoat, Klipspringer, Spinifex hopping mouse, Sifaka, Markhor, Bulldog bat, Water chevrotain, Mink, White-lipped peccary, Crab-eating fox, Water opossum, marine otter, Vontsira, Batfly & Gammaproteobacteria, Goeldi's monkey & Saddleback tamarin & White-lipped tamarin, Clownfish & sea anemone, Fire coral & algae, Bornean bat & pitcher plant, Burying beetles & phoretic mites, Fork-tailed drongo & sociable weaver, ants & aphids, antlion, Stonecat, Panther chameleon, Tiger salamander, Cat snake, Leopard frog, Green catbird, Dandelion.

2020 
Divisions: Tiny Terrors, Double Trouble, Cat-ish vs. Dog-ish, and AnthropoSCENE

Animals who did not advance to round two: Grandidier's Mongoose, Spotted Linsang, Falanouc, Greater Grison, Kinkajou, Caspian Seal, Giant Forest Genet, Solongoi, Pygmy Spotted Skunk, Kowari, Collared Pika, Gray-bellied Caenolestid, Least Chipmunk, Bank Vole, Northern Short-tailed Shrew, Seba's Short-tailed Bat, Southern Ningaui, Feral Pigeon, Chinchilla, Little Brown Bat, Face Mite, Bogue, Monarch Butterfly, Honeybee, Chytrid, Lynx, Zokor, Green Iguana, Harbor Porpoise, Filarial Nematode,  Acorn Barnacle, Long-legged Bat, Amoeba

2021 
Divisions: Tricksy Taxonomy, Red in Fur, Of Myth and Monsters, and Sea Beasties

Animals who did not advance to round two: Colo Colo Opossum, Aoudad, Kinda Baboon, Malagasy Striped Civet, Amami Rabbit, Common Treeshrew, Mara, Red Wolf, Southern Red-Backed Vole, Hopi Chipmunk, Red & White Giant Flying Squirrel, Siberian Weasel, Little Red Flying Fox, Ring-Tailed Vontsira, Red-Necked Pademelon, Red Squirrel, Goliath Beetle, Thorny Devil, Fire Salamander, Flying Dragon Lizard, Black & Red Bush Squirrel, White-Winged Vampire Bat, Brussels Griffon, Masarector nanubis, Planktonic Copepod, Lathe Acteon (Snail), Basket Star, Blue Glaucus, Demon Eartheater Cichlid, Tube Anemone, Aphrodite Anthias, Hydra

2022 
Divisions: Mammal Collectives, Wild North America, Queens of the Sea and Sky, and Why Not Both?

Animals who did not advance to round two: Labor of Moles, Town of Prairie Dogs, Herd of Reindeer, Prickle of Hedgehogs, Troop of Monkeys, Romp of Otters, Glaring of Cats, Skulk of Foxes, Mexican free-tailed bat, Southern Bog Lemming, 13-Lined Ground Squirrel, Marsh Rabbit, Kit Fox, Yellow-Bellied Marmot, Coyote, Badger, Mexican Free-Tailed Bat, Florida Bonneted Bat, Common Prawn, Iberian Ribbed Newt, Northern Jacana, Macaroni Penguin, Dobsonfly, Arctic Tern, Anglerfish, Hagfish, Lichen, Leaf Slug, Lungfish, Painted Redstart, New Zealand Lesser Short-Tailed Bat, Scansoriopterygid, Hairy Frog, Muntjac

References

External Links 

 Official Website
 March Mammal Madness Educational Resources

Nature conservation organizations based in the United States